The International Bobsleigh and Skeleton Federation (IBSF), originally known by the French name Fédération Internationale de Bobsleigh et de Tobogganing (FIBT), is the international sports federation for bobsleigh and skeleton. It acts as an umbrella organization for 14 national bobsleigh and skeleton associations . It was founded on 23 November 1923 by the delegates of Great Britain, France, Switzerland, Canada, and the United States at the meeting of their first International Congress in Paris, France. In June 2015, it announced a name change from FIBT to IBSF. The federation's headquarters are in Lausanne, Switzerland.

After the 2022 Russian invasion of Ukraine, the federation suspended the participation of Russian and Belarusian athletes and officials. It also suspended the Bobsleigh Federation of Russia until its next Congress in July 2022, where the suspension was renewed until further notice.

History of bobsleigh

The world's first bobsleigh club was founded in St. Moritz, Switzerland in 1897. By 1904, competitions were taking place on natural ice courses (Olympia Bobrun St. Moritz-Celerina). This growth led to the creation of the FIBT in 1923 with inclusion into the International Olympic Committee (IOC) the following year. At the 1924 Winter Olympics in Chamonix, the four-man event took place. In 1930, the first FIBT World Championships took place with the four-man event in Caux-sur-Montreux, Switzerland with the first two-man event taking place in Oberhof, Germany the following year. At the 1932 Winter Olympics in Lake Placid, New York, the two-man competition debuted. In 1935, the Internationaler Schlittensportsverband (ISSV – International Sled Sport Federation in ), a forerunner to the Federation Internationale de Luge de Course (FIL – International Luge Federation in ), was absorbed into the FIBT and a Section de Luge was created. The luge section would be abolished when the FIL was split off in 1957.

Because of the growing weight issue at the 1952 Winter Olympics, the first changes occurred when weight limits were introduced. Since then, configurations to the tracks and the bobsleigh itself would be regulated for both competition and safety reasons. Also, bobsleigh was not included in the 1960 Winter Olympics in Squaw Valley, California for cost reasons in track construction. The development of artificially refrigerated tracks in the late 1960s and early 1970s would greatly enhance speeds. World Cup competitions were first developed in the 1980s while women's competitions took place in the early 1990s. The 2-woman bobsleigh event had their first World Championships in Winterberg, Germany, in 2000 and debuted at the 2002 Winter Olympics in Salt Lake City.

History of skeleton
Skeleton was also founded in Switzerland in 1884 as part of the Cresta Run. It remained a Swiss competition until 1906 when the first competitions outside Switzerland took place in Austria. At the 1926 FIBT World Congress in Paris, it was approved that skeleton was an official Winter Olympic sport with competition taking place at the 1928 Winter Olympics in St. Moritz. 13 competitors from five nations took part. Twenty years later, skeleton reappeared on the Olympic program when the 1948 Winter Olympics returned to St. Moritz.

At the 1954 IOC meeting in Athens, Greece, skeleton was replaced by luge on the official Olympic program. This caused skeleton to fall into obscurity until the development of a "bobsleigh skeleton" which could be used on any bobsleigh track in 1970. The development of artificial tracks would also help the rebirth of skeleton as a sport.

The first European Championship was held in 1982 at Königsee, Germany, and the first World Championships were also staged in 1982 at St. Moritz. By 1986, the FIBT started funding skeleton and introduced training schools worldwide to grow the sport. The following year, skeleton European Championships were introduced annually. In 1989, skeleton World Championships were introduced, although the women's championships were not formed until 2000 at Igls, Austria. Skeleton was reintroduced in the Winter Olympic program when the IOC allowed competition for the 2002 Games in Salt Lake City, US.

IBSF competitions
The IBSF governs competitions on all bobsleigh and skeleton competitions at the European Championships, World Championships, World Cup, and Winter Olympic level.

Presidents
The following persons have served as president of IBSF:
 Count Renaud de la Frégeolière (1886–1981) of France; served 1923–1960
 Almicare Rotta (1911–1981) of Italy; served 1960–1980
 Klaus Kotter (1934–2010) from West Germany/Germany; served 1980–1994
 Robert H. Storey (born 1942) from Canada; served 1994–2010
 Ivo Ferriani (born 1960) from Italy; served since 2010

Championships
 IBSF World Championships
 IBSF Para Sport World Championship
 IBSF European Championships
 IBSF Junior World Championships
 Bobsleigh World Cup
 Skeleton World Cup
 Bobsleigh at the Winter Olympics
 Skeleton at the Winter Olympics

References

External links
 
 

Bobsleigh governing bodies
Skeleton governing bodies
Bobsleigh
Sports organizations established in 1923
International sports bodies based in Switzerland